Carlos Alonso Bazalar Arostegui (born March 19, 1990 in Lima) is a Peruvian football midfielder. He currently plays for Cienciano.

International career
Bazalar represented Peru at the 2007 FIFA U-17 World Cup in the Republic of Korea, where the Peruvian side reached the quarter finals. He also represented Peru at the 2007 South American Under-17 Football Championship in Ecuador and at the 2009 South American Youth Championship in Venezuela.

Personal life
Alonso is the son of the Peruvian former footballer Juan Carlos Bazalar.

References

External links
 Like Father, like Son, the Bazalars @ FIFA.com

1990 births
Living people
People from Cusco
Peruvian footballers
Peru international footballers
Peru youth international footballers
Association football midfielders
Cienciano footballers